The Yusheng S330 is a compact crossover SUV produced by JMC Yusheng and positioned below the Yusheng S350 SUV.

Overview

The Yusheng S330 compact crossover SUV is a joint-venture between JMC and Ford. Its research & development, design, and manufacturing comply with Ford's global standards.   The S330 made its debut at the 2016 Beijing Auto Show and was launched on the Chinese car market in the second half of the 2016. The S330 is the production version of the Yusheng S330 concept which was revealed during the 2015 Shanghai Auto Show.

Engine
The Yusheng S330 is powered by 1.5 liter turbocharged inline-4 engines developed by JMC in collaboration with AVL designated as JX4G15A5L and JX4G15B5L for the manual and automatic transmission vehicles respectively.

References

External links
Official website 

Crossover sport utility vehicles
Cars of China
Compact sport utility vehicles
Cars introduced in 2016